Joey Jayne, is an American and Navajo politician and attorney from Montana, who served as a Democratic member of the Montana House of Representatives from 2001 to 2009.

She served as Justice of the Peace in Lake and Sanders County, Montana counties from 2012 to 2014.  Jayne was the Democratic nominee in 2008 and 2012 for District Court Judge for Sanders and Lake counties. In 2012, she lost her bid for election after plagiarism charges regarding her application surfaced. She was also accused of illegal campaign practices by the Confederated Salish and Kootenai Tribes, but was not formally charged. She had worked for them as an attorney from 1998 to 2000.

See also
List of first women lawyers and judges in Montana
List of Native American jurists

References

External links
Montana House of Representatives - Joey Jayne Official Montana State Legislature website
Joey Jayne for District Court Judge Official campaign website
Project Vote Smart - Representative Joey Jayne (MT) profile
Follow the Money - Joey Jayne
2006 2004 2002 2000 campaign contributions

Members of the Montana House of Representatives
1957 births
Living people
Women state legislators in Montana
University of Montana alumni
Navajo people
Native American state legislators in Montana
Native American women in politics
20th-century Native Americans
21st-century Native Americans
20th-century Native American women
21st-century Native American women